Indianapolis Business Journal, often abbreviated IBJ, is a weekly newspaper published in Indianapolis, Indiana, U.S. IBJ reports on Central Indiana business. It is the leading publication of IBJ Media. The newspaper was founded in 1980 by Mark Vittert and John W. Burkhart and was bought by American City Business Journals in 1986, by MCP in 1988, and by Mickey Maurer and Bob Schloss in 1990. Its economic columnists include Morton Marcus and Michael J. Hicks.

See also
Media in Indianapolis

References

External links
The Official Website of the Indianapolis Business Journal

Newspapers published in Indiana
Mass media in Indianapolis